Fernando de Monroy was the 10th Captain-major of Portuguese Ceylon. Monroy was appointed in 1568 under Sebastian of Portugal, he was Captain-major until 1570. He was succeeded by Diogo de Melo Coutinho.

References

Captain-majors of Ceilão
16th-century Portuguese people